Nationality words link to articles with information on the nation's poetry or literature (for instance, Irish or France).

Events

Works published
 Sir William Davenant, The Works of Sr William D'Avenant, prose and poetry
 John Milton, Poems, &. Upon Several Occasions, second edition, revised and expanded, of Poems 1646

Births
Death years link to the corresponding "[year] in poetry" article:
 Probable date - John Oldmixon (died 1742), English historian, pamphleteer, poet and critic
 Latest likely date - Pierre des Maizeaux (died 1745), French writer and poet

Deaths
Birth years link to the corresponding "[year] in poetry" article:
 February 17 - Molière (born 1622),  French playwright, poet and actor
 March 15 - Salvator Rosa (born 1615), Italian painter and poet
 May 4 - Richard Braithwait (born 1588), English
 May 9 - Jacques Vallée, Sieur Des Barreaux (born 1599), French
 May 19 - Ingen (born 1592), Chinese Linji Chan Buddhist monk, poet and calligrapher
 November 16 - Katarina Zrinska (born 1625), Croatian noblewoman and poet
 December 15 - Margaret Cavendish, Duchess of Newcastle-upon-Tyne (born 1623), English noblewoman, poet and writer
 Alaol (born 1607), Bengali poet
 Xiao Yuncong (born 1596), Chinese landscape painter, calligrapher and poet

See also

 Poetry
 17th century in poetry
 17th century in literature
 Restoration literature

Notes

17th-century poetry
Poetry